Hooker is an unincorporated community in Fairfield County, in the U.S. state of Ohio.

History
A post office called Hookers Station was established in 1869, the name was changed to Hooker in 1882, and the post office closed in 1932. In 1912, Hooker had 300 inhabitants.

References

Unincorporated communities in Fairfield County, Ohio
Unincorporated communities in Ohio